Brine is a high-concentration solution of salt (typically sodium chloride or calcium chloride) in water.  In diverse contexts, brine may refer to the salt solutions ranging from about 3.5% (a typical concentration of seawater, on the lower end of that of solutions used for brining foods) up to about 26% (a typical saturated solution, depending on temperature). Brine forms naturally due to evaporation of ground saline water but it is also generated in the mining of sodium chloride. Brine is used for food processing and cooking (pickling and brining), for de-icing of roads and other structures, and in a number of technological processes. It is also a by-product of many industrial processes, such as desalination, so it requires wastewater treatment for proper disposal or further utilization (fresh water recovery).

In nature

Brines are produced in multiple ways in nature. Modification of seawater via evaporation results in the concentration of salts in the residual fluid, a characteristic geologic deposit called an evaporite is formed as different dissolved ions reach the saturation states of minerals, typically gypsum and halite. Dissolution of such salt deposits into water can produce brines as well. As seawater freezes, dissolved ions tend to remain in solution resulting in a fluid termed a cryogenic brine. At the time of formation, these cryogenic brines are by definition cooler than the freezing temperature of seawater and can produce a feature called a brinicle where cool brines descend, freezing the surrounding seawater.

The brine cropping out at the surface as saltwater springs are known as "licks" or "salines". The contents of dissolved solids in groundwater vary highly from one location to another on Earth, both in terms of specific constituents (e.g. halite, anhydrite, carbonates, gypsum, fluoride-salts, organic halides, and sulfate-salts) and regarding the concentration level. Using one of several classification of groundwater based on total dissolved solids (TDS), brine is water containing more than 100,000 mg/L TDS. Brine is commonly produced during well completion operations, particularly after the hydraulic fracturing of a well.

Uses

Culinary

Brine is a common agent in food processing and cooking. Brining is used to preserve or season the food. Brining can be applied to vegetables, cheeses and fruit in a process known as pickling. Meat and fish are typically steeped in brine for shorter periods of time, as a form of marination, enhancing its tenderness and flavor, or to enhance shelf period.

Chlorine production

Elemental chlorine can be produced by electrolysis of brine (NaCl solution). This process also produces sodium hydroxide (NaOH) and Hydrogen gas (H2). The reaction equations are as follows:

 Cathode: 
 Anode: 
 Overall process:

Refrigerating fluid
Brine is used as a secondary fluid in large refrigeration installations for the transport of thermal energy. Most commonly used brines are based on inexpensive calcium chloride and sodium chloride. It is used because the addition of salt to water lowers the freezing temperature of the solution and the heat transport efficiency can be greatly enhanced for the comparatively low cost of the material. This is called the eutectic point.

Because of their corrosive properties salt-based brines have been replaced by organic liquids such as ethylene glycol.

Sodium chloride brine spray is used on some fishing vessels to freeze fish. The brine temperature is generally . Given the higher temperature of brine, the system efficiency over air blast freezing can be higher. High-value fish usually are frozen at much lower temperatures, below the practical temperature limit for brine.

Water softening and purification
Brine is an auxiliary agent in water softening and water purification systems involving ion exchange technology. The most common example are household dishwashers, utilizing sodium chloride in form of dishwasher salt. Brine is not involved in the purification process itself, but used for regeneration of ion-exchange resin on cyclical basis. The water being treated flows through the resin container until the resin is considered exhausted and water is purified to a desired level. Resin is then regenerated by sequentially backwashing the resin bed to remove accumulated solids, flushing removed ions from the resin with a concentrated solution of replacement ions, and rinsing the flushing solution from the resin. After treatment, ion-exchange resin beads saturated with calcium and magnesium ions from the treated water, are regenerated by soaking in brine containing 6–12% NaCl. The sodium ions from brine replace the calcium and magnesium ions on the beads.

De-icing
In lower temperatures, a brine solution can be used to de-ice or reduce freezing temperatures on roads.

Quenching
Quenching is a heat-treatment process when forging metals such as steel . A brine solution, along with oil and other substances, is commonly used to harden steel. When brine is used, there is an enhanced uniformity of the cooling process and heat transfer.

Wastewater

Brine is a byproduct of many industrial processes, such as desalination, power plant cooling towers, produced water from oil and natural gas extraction, acid mine or acid rock drainage, reverse osmosis reject, chlor-alkali wastewater treatment, pulp and paper mill effluent, and waste streams from food and beverage processing. Along with diluted salts, it can contain residues of pretreatment and cleaning chemicals, their reaction byproducts and heavy metals due to corrosion.

Wastewater brine can pose a significant environmental hazard, both due to corrosive and sediment-forming effects of salts and toxicity of other chemicals diluted in it.

Unpolluted brine from desalination plants and cooling towers can be returned to the ocean. From the desalination process, reject brine is produced, which proposes potential damages to the marine life and habitats. To limit the environmental impact, it can be diluted with another stream of water, such as the outfall of a wastewater treatment or power plant. Since brine is heavier than seawater and would accumulate on the ocean bottom, it requires methods to ensure proper diffusion, such as installing underwater diffusers in the sewerage. Other methods include drying in evaporation ponds, injecting to deep wells, and storing and reusing the brine for irrigation, de-icing or dust control purposes.

Technologies for treatment of polluted brine include: membrane filtration processes, such as reverse osmosis and forward osmosis; ion exchange processes such as electrodialysis or weak acid cation exchange; or evaporation processes, such as thermal brine concentrators and crystallizers employing mechanical vapour recompression and steam.  New methods for membrane brine concentration, employing osmotically assisted reverse osmosis and related processes, are beginning to gain ground as part of zero liquid discharge systems (ZLD).

Composition and purification
Brine consists of concentrated solution of Na+ and Cl− ions.  Sodium chloride per se does not exist in water: it is fully ionized.  Other cations found in various brines include K+, Mg2+, Ca2+, and Sr2+.  The latter three are problematic because they form scale and they react with soaps.  Aside from chloride, brines sometimes contain Br− and I− and, most problematically, .  Purification steps often include the addition of calcium oxide to precipitate solid magnesium hydroxide together with gypsum (CaSO4), which can be removed by filtration.  Further purification is achieved by fractional crystallization.  The resulting purified salt is called evaporated salt or vacuum salt.

See also
 
 
 Brine pools – Anoxic pockets of high salinity on the ocean bottom

References

Salts
Coolants
Refrigerants
Hydrology
Industrial minerals